Stratioceros princeps is a species of beetle in the family Cerambycidae, and the only species in the genus Stratioceros. It was described by Lacordaire in 1869.

References

Lamiini
Beetles described in 1869